This is a partial list of Statutory Instruments published in the United Kingdom in the year 2018.

Employment Rights (Employment Particulars and Paid Annual Leave) (Amendment) Regulations 2018, SI 2018/1378
Road Transport (International Passenger Services) Regulations 2018, SI 2018/1395
Seafarers (Transnational Information and Consultation, Collective Redundancies and Insolvency Miscellaneous Amendments) Regulations 2018 (SI 2018/26)

See also
List of Statutory Instruments of the United Kingdom

References

Law of the United Kingdom
2018 in British law
Lists of Statutory Instruments of the United Kingdom